The Chicago version of the NWA World Tag Team Championship was a professional wrestling championship promoted by the Chicago-based Fred Kohler Enterprises, a member of the National Wrestling Alliance (NWA). The championship was for two-man tag teams only. While the NWA Board of Directors mandated that there would only be one NWA World Heavyweight Championship, they did not regulate the use of championships labeled "NWA World Tag Team Championship", allowing any member that so desired to create their own local version. As a result, as many as 13 different, regional versions were active in 1957, the highest number of active NWA World Tag Team Championships in existence at the same time.

The championship was introduced in 1953 when the promoters awarded the championship to Lord James Blears and Lord Athol Layton. The championship was promoted from 1953 until 1960 when Fred Kohler left the NWA to help form the American Wrestling Association (AWA) and thus the AWA World Tag Team Championship became the top tag team championship in the Chicago area. The Chicago promotion would later be bought by Dick Afflis, who merged it with his Indianapolis-based territory. The last NWA World Tag Team Championship was won by the Shires brothers, Roy and Ray, on April 9, 1960. The Volkoffs, Boris and Nicoli, held the championship four times, the record for the Chicago version of the NWA World Tag Team Championship. Art Neilson and Reggie Lisowski held the championship for 371 days, the longest individual reign in the championship's seven-year history. Being a professional wrestling championship, it is not won or lost competitively, but instead determined by the decision of the bookers of a wrestling promotion. The title is awarded after the chosen team "wins" a match to maintain the illusion that professional wrestling is a competitive sport.

Title history
Key

Team reigns by combined length
Key

Individual reigns by combined length
Key

See also
National Wrestling Alliance
NWA World Tag Team Championship

Footnotes

Concurrent championships
Sources for 13 simultaneous NWA World Tag Team Championships
NWA World Tag Team Championship (Los Angeles version)
NWA World Tag Team Championship (San Francisco version)
NWA World Tag Team Championship (Central States version)
NWA World Tag Team Championship (Chicago version)
NWA World Tag Team Championship (Buffalo Athletic Club version)
NWA World Tag Team Championship (Georgia version)
NWA World Tag Team Championship (Iowa/Nebraska version)
NWA World Tag Team Championship (Indianapolis version)
NWA World Tag Team Championship (Salt Lake Wrestling Club version)
NWA World Tag Team Championship (Amarillo version)
NWA World Tag Team Championship (Minneapolis version)
NWA World Tag Team Championship (Texas version)
NWA World Tag Team Championship (Mid-America version)

References

Chicago-related lists
Fred Kohler Enterprises championships
National Wrestling Alliance championships
Tag team wrestling championships
Professional wrestling in the Chicago metropolitan area
World professional wrestling championships